Danza is a musical genre.

Danza may also refer to:

Danza (ballet), a ballet choreographed by Martha Graham
Danza (horse), an American racehorse

Music
"La Danza", Rossini
La danza (Gluck), opera

People with the surname
Tony Danza (born 1951), American actor

See also
Danzas (disambiguation)